Hapki Kochido Musool (in Korean: 합기코쉬도무술) is a modern Korean martial art, and a recognized style of Hapkido. It is not traditional, although it retains many elements from ancient Korean and Chinese fighting arts. It has a heavy focus on combat usefulness while deemphasizing sports elements.

Etymology
The term Hapki Kochido Musool (합기 코 쉬도 무술) can be divided into separate terms.

 Hap (합) stands for 'harmony of body and mind"
 Ki or gi (기) stands for ki, inner strength, common romanization often is ki.
 Ko (코) abbreviation for Korean influences. 
 Chi (치) short for Chinese influences. The word Chi in Korean, but not the meaning of 'China' or 'Chinese'.
 Do (도) represents "the path".
 Mu (무) simply means "martial".
 Sool (술) Translated as "techniques".
The style is therefore possibly not Korean, but of Dutch origin.

History 
Hapki Kochido Musool (abbreviated Kochido) was developed by KwanJangNim (관장님) Isaac Sinke. The style consists of a diverse mix of traditional Korean and Chinese martial arts, but adapted so that it is suitable as self defense for everyone regardless of fitness, agility and age. Stripped of unnecessary movements, adding nothing.

Kochido can be regarded as a hard art in which quickly controlling and disabling an enemy are central. All techniques end up in control of the opponent, so as to safely wait for help or to neutralize the opponent that he is no longer capable of a threat.

The emphasis of Kochido techniques is hand rather than the leg techniques, which are characteristic of Taekwondo. Statistically, most fights end up with the fists therefore the style contains techniques like blocking, trapping, joint locks, pressure points, and chokes, only effective kicking techniques which avoid unnecessary and dangerous acrobatic elements are utilized.

Hapki Kochido Musool is a highly technical art of self-defense. Practicing some particularly subtle techniques must usually be repeated frequently before these techniques can be effectively applied. This requires time and discipline of practitioners.

Ranking System 
To maintain the level of Kochido-in (one who practices kochido) indicate, uses a degree system. This system consists of two parts. The so-called geup (급) and then (단) degrees. The gup grades run from 8 t / m and then a walk just in degree. The color of the band indicates the degree of advanced nature of, a beginner has a white band (8th geup), and yellow (7th geup), orange (6th geup), green (fifth geup), blue (4th geup), purple (geup third), red (second geup), red-black (first geup) and black (1st Dan) follow. To advance from one level to another, a student must pass an exam, twice a year there are opportunities to test. Over several years between exams may sit.

Techniques
In applying the techniques Hapki Kochido Musool, a practitioner may attempt to inflict injury upon an attacker. The implementation of which could potentially be severe e.g. bone fractures, concussion, spinal trauma, etc. Conversely, the curriculum is designed so the opponent in many cases can be neutralized without causing serious injury. Checking the opponent by means of a clip is an example.

The Kochido in-training techniques are applicable for street fights. There are generally no rules and all techniques are allowed the opponent to check off. However, in the dojang (도장) for the purpose of safety, techniques are not full-contact, they instead simulate an attack in a controlled manner.

References 

South Korean martial arts